is a Japanese media mix originally created by Fumikane Shimada via a series of magazine illustration columns. The franchise has since been adapted into several light novel, manga, and anime series and various video games. The series revolves around teenage girls who use machines attached to their legs to do aerial combat. The OVA preview episode was released in January 2007. The televised anime series later aired between July and September 2008. A second season aired between July and September 2010. A film adaptation was released on March 17, 2012, and a three-part OVA series was released between September 2014 and May 2015. A third season aired from October to December 2020.

A spin-off of the original series titled Brave Witches aired from October to December 2016, and a second spin-off titled Luminous Witches aired from July to September 2022.

Plot

On an alternate Earth during the World War II era, the world has been invaded by a mysterious alien force known as the Neuroi who take on forms similar to aircraft and spread a corrosive miasma. As a result, the armed forces of the world have allied together to combat the Neuroi threat instead of fighting among themselves. As the regular weaponry have no effect against the Neuroi's technology, the military instead calls upon Witches, young girls who possess magical abilities capable of fighting against the Neuroi. The Witches, who are inspired by famous real-life pilots, grow animal ears and tails when using their magic, and can use special machines known as Striker Units, which feature designs based on real-life aircraft, to fly through the sky and increase the strength of their magical ability in combat.

The light novel series follows the Suomus Independent Volunteer Aerial Squadron, focusing on a dogfighter named Tomoko Anabuki. The main anime franchise follows Yoshika Miyafuji, a girl from the Fuso Empire who joins the titular Strike Witches to investigate the death of her father and help fight off the Neuroi. The spin-off anime series, Brave Witches, follows a Fuso girl named Hikari Karibuchi, who joins the titular Brave Witches to fight in the place of her injured sister Takami.

Production
In a postscript column in Comp Ace, Fumikane Shimada had mentioned his desire to use his Mecha Musume concepts across a variety of media, leading to the production of the Strike Witches OVA by Gonzo. However, at about the same time Fumikane was also contracted to create the character designs for Sky Girls, which had its televised run in late 2007. During this time there was no word on the further development of a Strike Witches animated series, although promotional items such as plastic figures of the OVA's characters were released. Not until December 2007 was the anime officially announced, after which details were slowly released, such as the casting of the remaining main characters that had no lines in the OVA.

Media

Light novels
Three separate light novel series have been published. The first, was written by Noboru Yamaguchi and illustrated by Hashigo Ueda. The first volume was published on September 30, 2006, and the third and last on June 28, 2008. The Suomus Misfits Squadron series is set in a different time period and location from the anime, and uses a different cast of characters. A reboot of the first series of light novels began in October 2018. It is written by Toshihiko Tsukiji and illustrated by Kōsuke Tsukinami. As of October 2020 four volumes have been published using the title Silent Witches Suoms Iranko Company ReBOOT!.

The second light novel series, titled , was written by Hidehisa Nanbō and illustrated by Hashigo Ueda. As of June 30, 2010, the fourth and last volume has been published. The publication of this series coincided with the anime television series, and uses the same cast of characters; however, while some of the chapters are adaptations of the anime episodes, several are original.

The third light novel series  is the stories about the 506th Joint Fighter Wing. The timeline of the story happens in between from the beginning of the Season 2 anime to the before of the film. It is authored by Hidehisa Nanbō. The first volume was published in Japan on 1 January 2015. Volume 2 was published on 1 May 2015 and Volume 3 is published on 1 October 2015. Volume 4 was published on 1 March 2016 and volume 5 was published on 1 November 2016. The latest volume 8 was published on 1 May 2018. There are versions with the five original CD dramas from volumes 3 to 7.

Manga
There are currently ten manga series of Strike Witches: 

Written and illustrated by Yoshiyuki Kazumi. It was serialized in Comp Ace between September 26, 2005, and January 26, 2006. It was canceled after three chapters.

Written and illustrated by Yuki Tanaka, was serialized in Comp Ace between January 26 and November 26, 2008, with its chapters collected in two tankōbon volumes. Seven Seas Entertainment released the series in North America in April 2014.

Illustrated by Shin Kyogoku. Also referred to as Strike Witches 1.5, which takes place between the two anime series. Seven Seas Entertainment licensed the manga in North America.
 
Illustrated by Ningen. It focuses on Mio Sakamoto during the Fuso Sea Incident in 1937. It was serialized in Nyantype from October 30, 2010, to November 30, 2011, with its chapters collected in two volumes. Seven Seas Entertainment licensed the manga in North America.

Illustrated by Atsuto Shinozuka. It focuses on the Isle of Wight Detachment Group. It was serialized in Comp Ace between April 26, 2011, to June 26, 2012. Its chapters were collected in two volumes. Seven Seas Entertainment licensed the manga in North America.
 
Illustrated by Takeshi Nogami. Previously a semi-official dōjinshi which focuses on the African Front. A chapter was published in Comptiq on November 10, 2011, and a collected volume was released on January 26, 2012.

Illustrated by Shin Kyogoku. It follows the story of the Suomus LLV24, including telling the stories of Eila Juutilainen and Nikka Katajainen's past, characters who feature in the Strike Witches and Brave Witches anime respectively. It was serialized in Nyantype from September 30, 2013, to October 30, 2014, with its chapters collected in two volumes.

Illustrated by Atsuto Shinozuka. It follows the story of the 504th Joint Fighter Wing, taking place before and during the second season of the Strike Witches anime, and covers events from their perspective that correspond to the events of the anime. It was serialized in Comptiq from February 10, 2014, to September 10, 2015, with its chapters collected in three volumes.

Illustrated by Tsuchii. The manga is a prequel story for Erica Hartmann, following her early days in the Karlsland JG52, three years before the start of the Strike Witches anime. It was serialized in Comp Ace between March 26 and September 26, 2016, with its chapters collected in a single volume.

Illustrated by Tsuchii. A manga adaptation of the first few volumes of the Noble Witches light novel series. It was serialized in Comp Ace from May 26, 2017, to September 26, 2018, with its chapters collected in three volumes.

Self published works

Strike Witches: Witch in Africa
Published in August 2008, and jointly authored by Fumikane Shimada, Takaaki Suzuki, and Takeshi Nogami. It is considered semi-canonical. The B5-size publication contains a manga and novel section, both dealing primarily with the "Star of Africa" Hanna-Justina Marseille during the North African Campaign. Details on the Strike Witches world setting that could not be added into the anime were also added into the publication.
Strike Witches: Witch in Africa
Originally meant to be included in the anime DVD booklets, but because of a reduction in the booklet size, it was instead published as a dojin. The manga began serialization in Comptiq beginning November 10, 2011.
Strike Witches: Tiger in Desert
Published in December 2008. Similar to the first volume, and set in the same general time frame and location (North Africa, circa 1942). Consisting of two volumes it follows an experimental Karlsland tank witch unit based on the Tiger I.
World Witches: Witches of the Sphinx
Published from 2010 to 2012, the series takes place in North Africa, 1943 and concerns the joint effort of the Storm Witches and three tank witch units under the command of General Patton, General Montgomery and General Rommel in retaking the Suez Canal. Five volumes were released.
Sengoku Witches: The Witch of Honnoji
Published in 2009. Takes place during Japan's Sengoku period. Oda Nobunaga is rescued from Honnoji by his page, in this version the witch Mori Ranmaru, instead of committing suicide in the Honnō-ji Incident.

Anime

An original video animation directed by Kunihisa Sugishima and produced by Gonzo was released on January 1, 2007. The first anime season was produced by Gonzo and broadcast in Japan from July 3 to September 18, 2008. Aside from the traditional televised broadcast, the series was also made available with English subtitles and an English dub through YouTube, BOST TV and Crunchyroll, using a simultaneous release schedule similar to that of The Tower of Druaga: the Aegis of Uruk, also produced by Gonzo. The YouTube and Crunchyroll broadcasts operate under a streaming window, allowing users to freely watch each new episode of the series on the day of their release for a set amount of time. Crunchyroll also offers individual episodes to be purchased and downloaded during and after this streaming window has ended. An uncensored version of the series was later released on Region 2 DVD, containing nudity that was obscured for the TV broadcast. The first volume was made available on September 26, 2008, the second on October 24, the third volume on November 28, the fourth volume on December 26, and the fifth volume on January 30, 2009. The anime has been licensed by Funimation and was released on March 30, 2010.

A second series entitled Strike Witches 2 was produced by AIC and aired between July 7, 2010, and September 23, 2010. This season has also been acquired by Funimation Entertainment and was simulcast on their video portal, with an intended home video release in September 2011. The release was held back until October 2, 2012. Manga Entertainment released the series in the United Kingdom on September 24, 2012. A three-part OVA series produced by Silver Link titled Strike Witches: Operation Victory Arrow, which features three short stories taking place between the second anime season and the film, was released between September 20, 2014, and May 2, 2015.

A spin-off series by Silver Link, titled Brave Witches, began airing on October 5, 2016. The series is not a continuation of the previous seasons and instead focuses on the 502nd Joint Fighter Wing. Crunchyroll simulcasted the series worldwide. Funimation has released an English dub of the series. The series is scheduled to be released on Blu-ray and DVD in 2017. A 13th episode aired in theatres in 2017. Madman Entertainment is importing Funimation's release in Australia and New Zealand.

On July 8, 2018, a Strike Witches anime project titled Strike Witches: 501st Joint Fighter Wing Take Off! was announced as part of the World Witches series to commemorate the franchise's tenth anniversary. The 12-episode anime adaptation is based on the 2011 comedy spin-off 4-koma manga series by Makoto Fujibayashi. It aired from April 9 to June 25, 2019, on Tokyo MX, TV Aichi, MBS and BS11. The original cast of Strike Witches returned to reprise their roles. Acca effe and Giga Production are animating the series with Fumio Ito as director. Seiko Nagaoka, returned from Brave Witches to produce the music at Nippon Columbia. Production I.G and Anime Beans have been credited for animation production assistance. Funimation has acquired the licence to stream the series with English subs the same day as Japan, with an English dub set for premiere on April 23. The spin-off also received a 30-minute nationwide theatrical release planned for October 4 with returning cast and production committee from the spin-off TV show.  A new anime series titled World Witches Take Off! aired from January 13 to March 31, 2021, with the cast and staff from Strike Witches: 501st Joint Fighter Wing Take Off! reprising their roles.  The series will run for 12 episodes. Crunchyroll streamed the series with English subtitles.

A third season of Strike Witches series titled Strike Witches: Road to Berlin has been announced and aired from October 7 to December 23, 2020. David Production is animating the series with Kazuhiro Takamura returning as director, Striker Unit is handling the series composition, and Tatsuhiko Urata (Strike Witches and Strike Witches 2 scriptwriter) is credited as the chief writer. Seikou Nagaoka will produce the music at Nippon Columbia. Funimation is streaming the series with an English dub and Crunchyroll is streaming the series with subtitles.

Another new Strike Witches anime project titled as Luminous Witches has been announced. Initially scheduled to air in 2021, it was later delayed to 2022 due to "various circumstances." Shaft is animating the series with Shouji Saeki, who served as episode director and scriptwriter for Strike Witches and Strike Witches 2, directing the anime and handling the series composition. Shinya Murakami is credited for the "Witches series literature." Kadokawa is producing the music. The series aired from July 3 to September 25, 2022. The cast members performed the opening theme song "Wonderful World", as well as the ending theme song "Watashi to Minna no Uta". Sentai Filmworks has licensed the series.

Film
On October 28, 2010, a film adaptation of Strike Witches was announced to have been greenlit. Produced by AIC, the film was released in Japanese theaters on March 17, 2012, and on DVD and BD on October 26, 2012. The film was licensed by Funimation; they released it on Blu-ray on October 4, 2016.

A new 30-minute film for Strike Witches: 501st Joint Fighter Wing Take Off! was released in Japanese theaters on October 4, 2019.  The main cast members and staff reprise their roles from the anime.

Music
The first season used two pieces of theme music. , performed by Yoko Ishida is used as the opening.  is used as the ending. "Bookmark A Head" is performed by the main cast as usually duets and the singers vary from episode to episode. , translated by Takaaki Suzuki, and performed by Minna-Dietlinde Wilcke (Rie Tanaka), is used as an insert song in episode 8. In Funimation's release, a song also sung by Rie Tanaka from the CD album for the Strike Witches: What I Can Do Along With You game, was substituted for Lili Marleen. 

The single for "Strike Witches: To Do What I Can" was released on August 20, 2008, by Columbia Music Entertainment and also a version of "Bookmark A Head" performed by Misato Fukuen. The original soundtrack containing 36 tracks was released on September 9, 2008.

Additionally, five albums of character image songs were released by Columbia Music Entertainment:
Strike Witches Hime Uta Collection Sono 1 -Yoshika Miyafuji ~ Mio Sakamoto- released on March 18, 2009
Strike Witches Hime Uta Collection Sono 2 -Sanya V. Litvyak ~ Eila Ilmatar Juutilainen- released on March 18, 2009
Strike Witches Hime Uta Collection Sono 3 -Minna-Dietlinde Wilcke ~ Erica Hartmann ~ Gertrud Barkhorn- released on April 1, 2009
Strike Witches Hime Uta Collection Sono 4 -Perrine-H. Clostermann ~ Lynette Bishop ~ Yoshika Miyafuji- released on April 15, 2009
Strike Witches Hime Uta Collection Sono 5 - Francesca Lucchini ~ Charlotte E. Yeager- released on April 15, 2009

Video games
There are currently five games based on the Strike Witches franchise. While mainly based on the characters featured in the anime, characters from the two manga series also appear in some of the games. The first three Strike Witches games have the same opening, "private wing" by Yoko Ishida

 , is a simulation game developed by Russell Games for the Nintendo DS and released on November 26, 2009. It features Junko Takei. The Witches take under their wing a candidate commanding officer from the Fuso Empire, Junko. She contacts the 501st to inform them that she will be meeting up with them during a training exercise. At the same time the military announces a new operation: to make a concerted strike against the Neuroi at the Gallian coastline and establish a new frontline base. Pre-orders for the Nintendo DS version received a fake girl's gym shorts DS pouch with their order.
  is a visual novel title also developed by Russell Games for PlayStation 2, which was released on May 27, 2010. This adventure game features Amaki Suwa and Nishiki Nakajima. To the south of the base lies a deserted island where the Witches are conducting open-air exercises. However, when the carrier they are stationed on comes under surprise Neuroi attack, the Witches are left stranded. In the two weeks that it will take for reinforcements to arrive, the Witches decide to carry on with their maneuvers, as well as make sure they can survive.
 , is a bullet hell shoot 'em up developed by Cyberfront for Xbox 360. Players control a group of three witches, and change positions to best defend against the Neuroi. And this game also features Junko Takei, with Nishiki Nakajima as a downloadable character. It was released in Japan on July 29, 2010. On June 28, 2012, it was released on PlayStation Portable. Everything in Xbox 360 version also available in PSP version.
 A fourth game, was developed by Kadokawa Games for Nintendo DS. The game features tactical shootouts between Witches, as well as minigames in which the players massages one of the Witches. It was released in Japan on October 21, 2010.
 {{nihongo|502nd Joint Fighter Wing Brave Witches VR: Operation Baba-Yaga|第502統合戦闘航空団 ブレイブウィッチーズ VR-Operation Baba_yaga-雪中迎撃戦|
502nd Joint Fighter Wing Brave Witches VR- Operation Baba-Yaga- Snow Interception Battle}} was a VR game based on the Brave Witches anime. It was released for the PC and PlayStation 4 in Japan on 9 June, 2017.
  was developed by Cave for Android and iOS. The game was released in Japan on October 13, 2020.

Reception

John Oppliger of AnimeNation listed Strike Witches as one of the best girls with guns anime series, stating that "its numerous shooting scenes and its stellar action scene animation qualify it for recognition as one of anime’s outstanding girls with guns shows."

Explanatory notes

General references

External links
  
 Fumikane Shimada official site
 Funimation's official Strike Witches site
 Official video game homesite  
 

2006 Japanese novels
2005 manga
2007 anime OVAs
2008 anime television series debuts
2008 Japanese novels
2008 manga
2010 anime television series debuts
2010 Japanese novels
2011 manga
2012 anime films
2012 Japanese novels
2016 anime television series debuts
2016 anime OVAs
2017 anime OVAs
2019 anime television series debuts
2020 anime television series debuts
2021 anime television series debuts
2022 anime television series debuts
Alternate history anime
Anime International Company
Anime postponed due to the COVID-19 pandemic
David Production
Fiction about robots
Funimation
Girls with guns anime and manga
Gonzo (company)
Kadokawa Dwango franchises
Kadokawa Shoten games
Kadokawa Shoten manga
Kadokawa Sneaker Bunko
Light novels
Madman Entertainment anime
Magical girl anime and manga
Military anime and manga
Military science fiction
Muse Communication
Robots in television
Seinen manga
Sentai Filmworks
Seven Seas Entertainment titles
Shaft (company)
Silver Link
World War II alternate histories